John Clifford Happenny (May 18, 1901 – December 29, 1988) was an infielder in Major League Baseball. He played for the Chicago White Sox.

References

External links

1901 births
1988 deaths
Major League Baseball infielders
Chicago White Sox players
Baseball players from Massachusetts
Sportspeople from Waltham, Massachusetts